Clea-Nasira Hoyte (born 9 August 1981) is a Vincentian former cricketer who played primarily as a right-arm medium bowler. She appeared in three One Day Internationals for the West Indies in 2003. She played domestic cricket for Saint Vincent and the Grenadines.

References

External links

1981 births
Living people
Saint Vincent and the Grenadines women cricketers
West Indies women One Day International cricketers